A referendum on video lottery terminals was held on 14 May 2001 (to coincide with municipal elections) in 103 municipalities in New Brunswick. According to the chief electoral officer's report, "229,814 voters" or
"44% of eligible provincial voters, cast referendum ballots"

Background
According to the Canada West Foundation, New Brunswick was the first province to allow video lottery terminals in 1990. The terminals create large profits for the provincial government, with the New Brunswick government alone receiving $53.4 million from the machines between 1999 and 2000. The private businesses that house these machines also make a profit, with 47% ($47 million) of the revenue going to the private sector.

Despite the economic benefit, there is a strong social backlash against the terminals, and gambling in general, especially in Atlantic Canada, according to a 1999 survey by the Canada West Foundation. The survey found that 60% of those surveyed wanted more restrictions on gambling, 56% knew a problem gambler, and 62% agreed that "VLT gambling should be banned in your province".

During the 1999 New Brunswick election, Progressive Conservative leader Bernard Lord promised to hold a referendum on the terminals if elected Premier.

Referendum question
The question was as follows:

Results
The vote was, in several regions, close to within dozens of votes. The "Yes" side won with just over 53%:

The municipal electoral officer's report showed that, regionally, the areas who largely voted against the VLT's were located in Anglophone sections of the province, or Central and Western New Brunswick (Carleton, York, Victoria, Charlotte, Sunbury and Kings counties) while largely francophone and Acadian areas, such as Moncton, Bouctouche, Bathurst, Miramichi, and Northern New Brunswick (Madawaska and Campbellton) were more in favour of the Terminals.

References

2001 elections in Canada
Referendums in New Brunswick
2001 in New Brunswick
2001 referendums
Gambling referendums
May 2001 events in Canada